Muaraketalo is a village in the Batang Hari Regency in the Jambi Province of Sumatra, Indonesia.

Nearby towns and villages include Gurun-tua (7.8 nm), Durianluncuk (4.0 nm), Jangga (7.2 nm), Mandiangin (4.1 nm) and Pulaugading (9.2 nm).

References

External links
Satellite map at Maplandia.com

Populated places in Jambi